Kannaviou is a village in the Paphos District of Cyprus, located 9 km west of Pano Panagia.

References

Communities in Paphos District